Myelois osseella is a species of snout moth in the genus Myelois. It was described by Émile Louis Ragonot in 1887 and is known from Lebanon, Israel and North Africa, including Tunisia.

References

Moths described in 1887
Phycitini